The 1788–89 United States presidential election in Maryland took place between December 15, 1788, and January 10, 1789, as part of the 1788–1789 United States presidential election to elect the first President. Voters chose eight representatives, or electors to the Electoral College, who voted for President and Vice President. However, 2 electors would not vote.

Early elections were quite different from modern ones. Voters voted for individual electors, who were pledged to vote for certain candidates. Oftentimes, which candidate an elector intended to support was unclear. Prior to the ratification of the 12th amendment, each elector did not distinguish between a vote cast for President and Vice President, and simply cast two votes.

All electors were pledged to Washington, but there was a Federalist slate which supported Robert H. Harrison for Vice President and an Anti-Federalist slate which supported George Clinton for Vice President. Additionally, there were two electors supported by both parties. Maryland chose the Federalist electors over the Anti-Federalist electors by a large margin. John Rogers, the highest elector supported by both parties, received 7,665. The highest Federalist elector, Alexander C. Hanson, received 5,596 votes. The highest Anti-Federalist elector, Jeremiah T. Chase, received 2,278 votes.

Results

Results by county

See also
 United States presidential elections in Maryland
 1788–89 United States presidential election
 1788–89 United States elections

Notes

References 

Maryland
1789
Presidential